The Otterhound is a British dog breed. It is a scent hound and is currently recognised by the Kennel Club as a Vulnerable Native Breed with around 600 animals worldwide.

Ancestry
The first recorded Otterhounds known to resemble the current breed are in the North-West of England in the first half of the 19th century – for example, the Hawkstone Otter Hunt and Squire Lomax's Otterhounds. In the second half of the 19th century, French Griffons were outcrossed, including one-eighth Wolf cross/Griffon Vendéen from the Comte de Canteleu in Normandy. In the early 20th century the Griffon Nivernais was crossed into the breed, and one particular dog, Boatman, a Grand Griffon Vendéen/Bloodhound cross, became an ancestor for several kennels.

Appearance
The Otterhound is a large, rough-coated hound with an imposing head. Originally bred for hunting, it has great strength and a strong body with long striding steps. This makes it able to perform prolonged hard work. The Otterhound hunts its quarry both on land and in water and it has a combination of characteristics unique among hounds; most notably an oily, rough, double coat and substantial webbed feet. They have a nose that can track in the mud and water for over 72 hours

They have extremely sensitive noses, which make them inquisitive and perseverant in investigating scents. Consequently, they need particular supervision when outdoors. They are friendly dogs with a unique bass voice which they use frequently.

Hunting

Otter hunting dates back to the early medieval period, with references to it found as early as 1360. The otterhound, however, can only be traced back as a distinct breed as far as the early 1800s.

The otter is one of the largest and most intelligent carnivorous mammals in Europe. To be equal to the otter, an Otterhound was said to need "a Bulldog's courage, a Newfoundland's strength in water, a Pointer's nose, a Retriever's sagacity, the stamina of a Foxhound, the patience of a Beagle, and the intelligence of a Collie".

In 1978, due to the dramatic decline in otter numbers, the otter was placed on the list of protected species in Britain, and otter hunting therefore ceased. It was never banned in Britain, the otter hunts stopped hunting voluntarily, as it was they who realised that otter numbers were dropping dramatically and brought it to the attention of the authorities. By 1977, nine registered packs of otterhounds were still in existence. A few hunts switched to hunting mink or coypu, but many of the original otterhound packs ceased to exist altogether. Hounds were often passed to newly founded minkhound packs. The Pembroke and Carmarthenshire Minkhounds are the only pack today with a pure otterhound pack. As the dogs had been selectively bred for their hunting capabilities, only a few of the bloodlines were suitable for breeding into companion animals.

Health 
The average lifespan of the breed is a little over 10 years. A quarter will live 12 to 15 years. At least one hound is known to have  lived to be 16 years old.

The Otterhound enjoys considerable exercise, but can also be a couch potato. They can be good family dogs but need to be kept in a secure property since they can jump fences up to 5 feet high, but rarely try.

In spite of the small gene pool, the Otterhound is generally a healthy breed, but is subject to many of the same complaints as all large, rapidly growing dogs.

Common problems that can occur are elbow and hip dysplasia, a malformation of the elbow and hip joints. These are not always painful, but can cause lameness and impair mobility, and result in arthritis. Badly affected hounds should not be bred from, but most Otterhounds have a poor hip and elbow score. The problem can be reduced by making sure that young Otterhounds do not jump down from high places, go up and down the stairs or walk too much on very hard surfaces while bones are still growing. This enables the muscles around the sockets to strengthen and develop, providing more support.

Otterhounds have a predisposition to ear problems (as can any breed with this type of ear) and a predisposition to gastric dilatation volvulus (bloat), due to their deep chest.

Epilepsy and seizures are also known to affect the breed, and can be hereditary. There is ongoing research into the causes of epilepsy in Otterhounds. For reasons currently unknown, epilepsy in Otterhounds in the United States does not appear to be fatal, while epilepsy found Otterhounds from the United Kingdom is frequently untreatable, and is usually fatal.

Endangered breed
In 2012 it was estimated there were around 600 otterhounds in the world. It is considered to be the most endangered native breed in Britain, with only 41 new registrations in 2016. This is partly because otterhounds have never been numerous, and even in the early 20th century, when otter hunting as a sport was at the height of its popularity, the number of dogs was still small. They are on the list of Vulnerable Native Breeds as identified by the UK Kennel Club, and great efforts are being made to save the breed.

See also
 Dogs portal
 List of dog breeds

References

Bibliography

External links

FCI breeds
Scent hounds
Rare dog breeds
Dog breeds originating in England
Companion dogs
Vulnerable Native Breeds
Hunting with hounds